El Bufete del Amor was a professional wrestling trio team consisting of Marco Corleone, Máximo and Rush, working for Consejo Mundial de Lucha Libre (CMLL). They are former one-time CMLL World Trios Champions.

History
On December 17, 2011, Marco Corleone, Máximo and Rush defeated Mr. Niebla, Negro Casas and Rey Bucanero in two straight falls. After the event, the trio of Corleone, Rush and Máximo was given the name La Tercia Sensación, which was later changed to El Bufete del Amor. On February 19, 2012, El Bufete del Amor defeated Los Hijos del Averno (Averno, Ephesto and Mephisto) to win the CMLL World Trios Championship. In the fall of 2012 El Bufete began a feud against the Mexican National Trios Champions Los Invasores (Volador Jr., Mr. Águila and Kraneo). The two teams fought several occasions with El  Bufete's CMLL World Trios Chamipnship on the line, while Los Invasores Mexican National Trios Championship being passed over compared to the more prestigious CMLL title. In May, Corleone was sidelined with a knee injury, leading to CMLL stripping him, Máximo and Rush of the CMLL World Trios Championship. On September 16, 2014, Corleone and Rush defeated El Terrible and Rey Escorpión to win La Copa CMLL. On October 3, 2014, Máximo participated in the 2014 La Copa Junior VIP tournament, qualifying for the finals by defeating Puma, Stuka, Jr. and then finally La Sombra (by disqualification) to qualify for the finals. On October 10, Maximo defeated Mephisto to win his first ever La Copa Junior.

Championships and accomplishments
Consejo Mundial de Lucha Libre
CMLL World Trios Championship (1 time)
Copa CMLL (2014) – Corleone and Rush
La Copa Junior (2014 VIP) – Maximo

References

External links
Marco Corleone's CMLL Profile
Maximo's CMLL Profile
Rush's CMLL Profile

Consejo Mundial de Lucha Libre teams and stables